Ruth Stevens (born Ruth Astrid Frideborg Nilsson; 21 March 1903 – 27 March 1989) was a Swedish stage and film actress. She was generally cast playing degenerate young woman.  She was married to the film director Gösta Stevens and the actor Harry Roeck-Hansen.

Selected filmography
 Skipper's Love (1931)
 Love and Deficit (1932)
 Black Roses (1932)
 Dear Relatives (1933)
 Wife for a Day (1933)
 A Wedding Night at Stjarnehov (1934)
 He, She and the Money (1936)
 It Pays to Advertise (1936)
 Witches' Night (1937)
 Career (1938)
 Circus (1939)
 If I Could Marry the Minister (1941)
 The Yellow Clinic (1942)

References

Bibliography
 Iverson, Gunnar, Soderbergh Widding, Astrid & Soila, Tytti. Nordic National Cinemas. Routledge, 2005.

External links

1903 births
1989 deaths
Swedish film actresses
Swedish stage actresses
20th-century Swedish actresses
People from Norrköping